The term climate footprint has emerged from the field of carbon footprinting, and refers to a measure of the full set of greenhouse gases (GHGs) controlled under the Kyoto Protocol. A climate footprint is a more comprehensive measure of anthropogenic impact upon the climate than a carbon footprint, but is also more costly and labour-intensive to calculate.
 
A climate footprint is a measure of the total amount of carbon dioxide (CO2), methane (CH4), nitrous oxide (N2O), hydrofluorocarbons (HFCs), perfluorocarbons (PFCs) and sulphur hexafluoride (SF6) emissions of a defined population, system or activity, considering all relevant sources, sinks and storage within the spatial and temporal boundary of the population, system or activity of interest. Calculated as carbon dioxide equivalent (CO2e) using the relevant 100-year global warming potential (GWP100).

Climate footprint for food

For food production, methane (CH4) and nitrous oxide (N2O) are two other greenhouse gases with often much larger impact on climate change and global warming. or food producers the emissions of methane primarily originate from the digestive systems of ruminants, manure management and rice production. The different gases react differently. So whereas Methane is a short-lived but very strong emission, Nitrous oxide is both a strong and long-lived greenhouse gas. Nitrous oxide is emitted from cropland that is fertilized and a small proportion of the nitrogen that is applied to fields is converted into nitrous oxide. Nitrous oxide emissions also come from manure handling and when synthetic fertilizers are produced.

There are also emissions of carbon dioxide (CO2) from food production when using fossil fuels for machinery and transports. Those emissions although constitute a minor part of the total emissions of a food product. Therefore, to make a true estimation of the total climate impact of food products one should calculate the climate footprint rather than the carbon footprint. The world's largest open database, for climate footprints for food is a part of a digital network where food producers etc. add their data for public knowledge.

Notes 

Climate change and the environment
Environmental indices